Dame Margaret Lloyd George  (4 November 1864 – 20 January 1941) was a Welsh humanitarian and one of the first seven women magistrates appointed in Britain in 1919. She was the wife of Prime Minister David Lloyd George from 1888 until her death in 1941.

Early life 
She was born on 4 November 1864 to Richard Owen, an elder of Capel Mawr of Criccieth, Caernarfonshire, a well-to-do Methodist farmer and valuer. She was educated at Dr Williams' School for Girls, Dolgellau.

Marriage and children 
On 1 January 1888, she married Lloyd George.  Her father initially disapproved of him. They had five children:

 Richard, later 2nd Earl Lloyd-George of Dwyfor (1889–1968) wrote a book about his mother Dame Margaret: The Life Story of His Mother.
 Mair Eluned (1890–1907)
 Lady Olwen Elizabeth Carey Evans,   (3 April 1892 – 2 March 1990); she married Major Sir Thomas John Carey Evans (died 25 August 1947) in 1917 at London's Welsh Baptist Chapel. She was the grandmother of Margaret MacMillan and great-grandmother of television presenter Dan Snow.
 Gwilym, later 1st Viscount Tenby (1894–1967)
 Lady Megan Lloyd George,  (1902–1966), the first female Member of Parliament (MP) for a Welsh constituency

Political activity and public service 

In 1918, during her husband's premiership, Margaret was appointed Dame Grand Cross of the Order of the British Empire (GBE) after raising over £200,000 for war charities.

On 24 December 1919, the day after the Sex Disqualification (Removal) Act 1919 received Royal Assent, Margaret Lloyd George was one of the first seven women to be appointed as a Magistrate, alongside Lady Crewe, Lady Londonderry, Elizabeth Haldane, Gertrude Tuckwell, Beatrice Webb and Mary Augusta Ward. She was the first Welsh woman to hold this office.

On 8 December 1920, Margaret Lloyd George visited Leeds and stayed with Lady Airedale, whose home was nearby. Baroness Airedale "expressed her great pleasure at the presence of Dame Margaret Lloyd George at the very successful reception at Leeds, to which over 150 prominent ladies of Coalition Liberal sympathies were invited from all parts of Yorkshire".

Margaret Lloyd George had earlier presided over a meeting on 21 October 1920, at which the Young Wales Association was founded. This meeting, at the Portman Rooms, Baker Street, was attended by over 400 members of the London Welsh community. Margaret Lloyd George subsequently became its President (1921–22). The Young Wales Association, which afterwards became the London Welsh Trust, runs the London Welsh Centre on Gray's Inn Road, London, which she opened on 29 November 1930.

She served on Criccieth Urban District Council from 1919 until her death, including three years as its chairman, was the first female Justice of the Peace in Caernarfonshire, and was president of the Women's Liberal Federation of North and South Wales.

Death 
She died at her home in Criccieth, Wales on 20 January 1941 after a period of illness following a fall when she injured her hip.

References

External links
 
 David Lloyd George Exhibition, National Library of Wales

1864 births
1941 deaths
British humanitarians
Dames Grand Cross of the Order of the British Empire
David Lloyd George
Burials in Wales
People from Caernarfonshire
Spouses of prime ministers of the United Kingdom
Liberal Party (UK) councillors
Councillors in Wales
Welsh justices of the peace
Margaret
Women councillors in Wales